Phillip Sam Figa (July 27, 1951 – January 5, 2008) was an American attorney and jurist who served as a United States district judge of the United States District Court for the District of Colorado.

Early life and education

Born in Chicago, Illinois to Russian Jewish immigrants, Figa attended Northwestern University "through a scholarship caddie program at a nearby country club". He received a Bachelor of Arts degree in economics from Northwestern in 1973, and a Juris Doctor from Cornell Law School in 1976.

Career 
Figa was in private practice in Denver, Colorado, from 1976 to 2003.

Figa was one of five people recommended by Senators Ben Nighthorse Campbell and Wayne Allard for a seat on the United States District Court for the District of Colorado after Richard Paul Matsch entered senior status. On June 9, 2003, he was nominated by President George W. Bush for the role. Figa was confirmed by the United States Senate on October 2, 2003, and received his judicial commission on October 6, 2003.

Illness and death

In March 2007, Figa was diagnosed with an aggressive brain tumor. He continued to serve until his death. He died on January 5, 2008, in his home in Greenwood Village, Colorado.

References

External links

1951 births
2008 deaths
Cornell Law School alumni
Neurological disease deaths in Colorado
Deaths from cancer in Colorado
Deaths from brain cancer in the United States
Judges of the United States District Court for the District of Colorado
Northwestern University alumni
United States district court judges appointed by George W. Bush
21st-century American judges